The Deadly Hunt is a 1971 American thriller television film directed by John Newland, starring Tony Franciosa, Peter Lawford, and Jim Hutton.

It was also known as Autumn of a Hunter after the title of the novel on which it was based.

Plot
A married couple are chased by two hunters.

Cast
Tony Franciosa as Ryan
Peter Lawford as Mason
Jim Hutton as Cliff
Tim McIntire as Peter
Anjanette Comer as Martha
Thomas Hauff as Danny

Reception
The Los Angeles Times called it "routine, time killing."

References

External links

1971 television films
1971 films
1970s thriller films
American thriller films
CBS network films
Films about fires
Films based on American novels
Films about hunters
Films scored by Vic Mizzy
Films shot in British Columbia
1970s English-language films
1970s American films